WOTC is a Religious formatted broadcast radio station licensed to Edinburg, Virginia, serving Woodstock and Shenandoah County, Virginia.  WOTC is owned and operated by Valley Baptist Church - Christian School.

Programming
WOTC carries programs from area churches along with religious and Christian music from local artists mixed with programs from the Fundamental Broadcasting Network located in Morehead City, North Carolina. It also carries news programming from USA Radio News.

References

External links
 

Radio stations established in 1993
1993 establishments in Virginia
OTC
Shenandoah County, Virginia